Suzanne Anne de Dietrich (29 January 1891, in Niederbronn-les-Bains – 24 January 1981) was a French Protestant theologian known for her work in the ecumenical movement.

References 
 Hans-Rudi Weber: Suzanne de Dietrich 1891–1981, la passion de vivre. Éditions Olivétan, 1995.

External links
 

1891 births
1981 deaths
People from Bas-Rhin
People from Alsace-Lorraine
French Protestant theologians
French humanitarians
Women humanitarians
20th-century Protestant theologians
Women Christian theologians
20th-century French theologians
Calvinist pacifists
Huguenots